European Universities Golf Championships were included on the EUSA Sports Program in 2009 and are organised on a bi-annual basis since.

The European Universities Golf Championships are coordinated by the European University Sports Association along with the 18 other sports on the program of the European universities championships.

Overview

External links 
 EUSA official website

References
 

golf
Golf tournaments in Europe